is a railway station on the Chūō Main Line in Suginami, Tokyo, Japan, operated by East Japan Railway Company (JR East).

Lines
Asagaya Station is served by Chūō-Sōbu Line local and Chūō Line (Rapid) services (not including special rapid services and other fast trains) of the Chūō Main Line on weekdays. On weekends, only local trains stop at this station.

Platforms

History
The station opened on July 15, 1922.

References

Chūō Main Line
Chūō-Sōbu Line
Stations of East Japan Railway Company
Railway stations in Tokyo
Railway stations in Japan opened in 1922